Toll-like receptor 9 is a protein that in humans is encoded by the TLR9 gene. TLR9 has also been designated as CD289 (cluster of differentiation 289). It is a member of the toll-like receptor (TLR) family. TLR9 is an important receptor expressed in immune system cells including dendritic cells, macrophages, natural killer cells, and other antigen presenting cells. TLR9 is expressed on endosomes internalized from the plasma membrane, binds DNA (preferentially DNA containing unmethylated CpGs of bacterial or viral origin), and triggers signaling cascades that lead to a pro-inflammatory cytokine response. Cancer, infection, and tissue damage can all modulate TLR9 expression and activation. TLR9 is also an important factor in autoimmune diseases, and there is active research into synthetic TLR9 agonists and antagonists that help regulate autoimmune inflammation.

Function 

The TLR family plays a fundamental role in pathogen recognition and activation of innate immunity. TLRs are named for the high degree of conservation in structure and function seen between mammalian TLRs and the Drosophila transmembrane protein Toll. TLRs are transmembrane proteins, expressed on the cell surface and the endocytic compartment and recognize pathogen-associated molecular patterns (PAMPs) that are expressed on infectious agents and initiate signaling to induce production of cytokines necessary for the innate immunity and subsequent adaptive immunity. The various TLRs exhibit different patterns of expression.

This gene is preferentially expressed in immune cell rich tissues, such as spleen, lymph node, bone marrow and peripheral blood leukocytes. Studies in mice and humans indicate that this receptor mediates cellular response to unmethylated CpG dinucleotides in bacterial DNA to mount an innate immune response.

TLR9 is usually activated by unmethylated CpG sequences in DNA molecules. Once activated, TLR9 moves from the endoplasmic reticulum to the Golgi apparatus and lysosomes, where it interacts with MyD88, the primary protein in its signaling pathway. TLR9 is cleaved at this stage to avoid whole protein expression on cell surface, which could lead to autoimmunity. CpG sites are relatively rare (~1%) on vertebrate genomes in comparison to bacterial genomes or viral DNA.  TLR9 is expressed by numerous cells of the immune system such as B lymphocytes, monocytes, natural killer (NK) cells, keratinocytes, melanocytes, and plasmacytoid dendritic cells. TLR9 is expressed intracellularly, within the endosomal compartments and functions to alert the immune system of viral and bacterial infections by binding to DNA rich in CpG motifs. TLR9 signals leads to activation of the cells initiating pro-inflammatory reactions that result in the production of cytokines such as type-I interferon, IL-6, TNF and IL-12. There is also recent evidence that TLR9 can recognize nucleotides other than unmethylated CpG present in bacterial or viral genomes. TLR9 has been shown to recognized DNA:RNA hybrids.

Role in non-viral cancer 
TLR9 expression progression during cancer varies greatly with the type of cancer. TLR9 may even present an exciting new marker for many cancer types. Breast cancer and renal cell carcinoma have both been shown to diminish expression of TLR9. In these cases higher levels correspond with better outcomes. Conversely studies have shown higher levels of TLR9 expression in breast cancer and ovarian cancer patients, and poor prognosis is associated with higher TLR9 expression in prostate cancer. Non-small cell lung cancer and glioma have also been shown to up-regulate the expression of TLR9. While these results are highly variable, it is clear that TLR9 expression increases the capacity for invasion and proliferation. Whether cancer induces modification of TLR9 expression or TLR9 expression hastens the onset of cancer is unclear, but many of the mechanisms that regulate cancer development also play a role in TLR9 expression. DNA damage and the p53 pathway influence TLR9 expression, and the hypoxic environment of tumor cells certainly induces expression of TLR9, further increases proliferation ability of the cancerous cells. Cellular stress has also been shown to relate to TLR9 expression. It is possible that cancer and TLR9 have a feed-forward relationship, where the occurrence of one leads to the up-regulation of the other. Many viruses take advantage of this relationship by inducing certain TLR9 expression patterns to first infect the cell (down-regulate) then trigger the onset of cancer (up-regulate).

Expression in oncogenic viral infection

Human papilloma virus (HPV) 
Human papilloma virus is a common and widespread disease that, if left untreated, can lead to epithelial lesions and cervical cancer. HPV infection inhibits the expression of TLR9 in keratinocytes, abolishing the production of IL-8. However inhibition of TLR9 by oncogenic viruses is temporary, and patients with long-lasting HPV actually show higher levels of TLR9 expression in cervical cells. In fact, the increase in expression is so severe that TLR9 could be used as a biomarker for cervical cancer. The relationship between HPV-induced epithelial lesion, cancer progression, and TLR9 expression is still under investigation.

Hepatitis B virus (HBV) 
Hepatitis B virus down-regulates the expression of TLR9 in pDCs and B cells, destroying the production of IFNα and IL-6. However, just as in HPV, as the disease progresses TLR9 expression is up-regulated. HBV induces an oncogenic transformation, which leads to a hypoxic cellular environment. This environment causes the release of mitochondrial DNA, which has CpG regions that can bind to TLR9. This induces over-expression of TLR9 in tumor cells, contrary to the inhibitory early stages of infection.

Epstein-Barr virus (EBV) 
Epstein-Barr virus, like other oncogenic viruses, decreases the expression of TLR9 in B cells, diminishing production of TNF and IL-6. EBV has been reported to alter expression of TLR9 at the transcription, translation, and protein level.

Polyomavirus 
The viruses of the polyomavirus family destroy expression of TLR9 in keratinocytes, inhibiting the release of IL-6 and IL-8. Expression is regulated at the promoter, where antigen proteins inhibit transcription. Similar to HPV and HBV infection, TLR9 expression increases as the disease progresses, probably due to the hypoxic nature of the solid tumor environment.

Clinical relevance of inflammation response 
TLR9 has been identified as a major player in systemic lupus erythematosus (SLE) and erythema nodosum leprosum (ENL). Loss of TLR9 exacerbates progression of SLE, and leads to increased activation of dendritic cells. TLR9 also controls the release of IgA and IFN-a in SLE, and loss of the receptor leads to higher levels of both molecules. In SLE, TLR9 and TLR7 have opposing effects. TLR9 regulates inflammatory response, while TLR7 promotes inflammatory response. TLR9 has an opposite effect in ENL. TLR9 is expressed at high levels on monocytes of ENL patients, and is positively linked to the secretion of proinflammatory cytokines TNF, IL-6, and IL-1β. TLR9 agonists and antagonists may be useful in treatment of a variety of inflammatory conditions, and research in this area is active. Autoimmune thyroid diseases have also been shown to correlate with an increase in expression of TLR9 on peripheral blood mononuclear cells (PBMCs). Patients with autoimmune thyroid diseases also have higher levels of the nuclear protein HMGB1 and RAGE protein, which together act as a ligand for TLR9. HMGB1 is released from lysed or damaged cells. HMGB1-DNA complex then binds to RAGE, and activates TLR9. TLR9 can work through MyD88, an adaptor molecule that increases the expression of NF-κB. However autoimmune thyroid diseases also increase sensitivity of MyD88 independent pathways. These pathways ultimately leads to the production of pro-inflammatory cytokines in PMBCs for patients with autoimmune thyroid diseases. Autoimmune diseases can also be triggered by activated cells undergoing apoptosis and being engulfed by antigen-presenting cells. Activation of cells leads to de-methylation, which exposes CpG regions of host DNA, allowing an inflammatory response to be activated through TLR9. Although it is possible that TLR9 also recognizes unmethylated DNA, TLR9 undoubtedly has a role in phagocytosis-induced autoimmunity.

Role in heart health 
Inflammatory responses mediated by TLR9 pathways can be activated by unmethylated CpG sequences that exist within human mitochondrial DNA. Usually, damaged mitochondria are digested via autophagy in cardiomyocytes, and mitochondrial DNA is digested by the enzyme DNase II. However, mitochondria that escape digestion via the lysosome/autophagy pathway can activate TLR9-induced inflammation via the NF-κB pathway. TLR9 expression in hearts with pressure overload leads to increased inflammation due to damaged mitochondria and activation of the CpG binding site on TLR9. 

There is evidence that TLR9 may play a role in heart health for individuals who have already suffered a myocardial infarction. In murine trials, TLR9-deficient mice had less myofibroblast proliferation, meaning cardiac muscle recovery is connected to TLR9 expression. Furthermore, class B CpG sequences induce proliferation and differentiation of fibroblasts via the NF-κB pathway, the same pathway that initiates pro-inflammatory reactions in the immune responses. TLR9 shows specific activity in post-heart attack fibroblasts, inducing them to differentiate into myofibroblasts and speed repair of left ventricle tissue. In contrast to pre-myocardial infarction, cardiomyocytes in recovering hearts do not induce an inflammation response via TLR9/NF-κB pathway. Instead, the pathway leads to proliferation and differentiation of fibroblasts.

As an immunotherapy target 

There are new immunomodulatory treatments undergoing testing which involve the administration of artificial DNA oligonucleotides containing the CpG motif. CpG DNA has applications in treating allergies such as asthma, immunostimulation against cancer,  immunostimulation against pathogens, and as adjuvants in vaccines.

TLR9 agonists
 Lefitolimod (MGN1703) in combination with ipilimumab (Yervoy) has started clinical trials to treat patients with advanced solid malignancies.
 Ongoing studies are investigating SD-101 in combination with pembrolizumab (Keytruda), an anti-PD-1 therapy developed by Merck.
 A Phase 1/2 trial is ongoing with tilsotolimod (IMO-2125) in combination with ipilimumab, an anti-CTLA-4 therapy developed by Bristol-Myers Squibb in anti-PD-1 refractory melanoma patients. FDA also granted fast track designation for tilsotolimod in combination with ipilimumab for treatment of PD-1 refractory metastatic melanoma. A phase 3 global trial (NCT03445533) in the same population began in 2018.

Protein interactions 

 TLR9 has been shown to interact with RNF216.
Epidermal growth factor receptor (EGFR) is constitutively bound to TLR9.
 It can be activated by CpG Oligodeoxynucleotides such as Agatolimod.

References

External links 
 
 

9
Clusters of differentiation